"I'm Revived" is a song by the Irish alternative rock sestet, Royseven, found on their debut album, The Art of Insincerity. The song was released as their third Irish single (following the limited edition double A-side, "Happy Ever Afters/Roy") in February 2007, entering the Irish Singles Chart on February 15 where it reached #26 and spent one week.

External links
 Official band website
 Royseven MySpace

2007 singles
Royseven songs
2006 songs
Universal Records singles